Jijie railway station, also known as Gejiu Jijie Railway Station (个旧鸡街火车站) or Jijie station, was a station of Yunnan-Vietnam Railway. The station is located in the north of Jijie Town of Gejiu City, its construction began in 1915 and was completed and put into use in 1921. Currently, the railway station has been abandoned.

Gejiu has a long history of tin mining, which gave birth to an industrial architectural heritage group represented by the Jijie railway station.

Buildings and lines
Its main building is a French-style building, with station houses, waiting rooms, storage and transportation rooms, traffic lanes. It is the central hub station of Gebishi railway, reaching Mengzi in the east, Gejiu in the south, Jianshui and Shiping in the west, and Kaiyuan and Kunming in the north.

Heritage conservation
On May 25, 2006, it was selected as Major Historical and Cultural Site Protected at the National Level by State Council of the People's Republic of China.

References

Railway stations in China opened in 1921
Transport in Honghe Hani and Yi Autonomous Prefecture
Railway stations in Yunnan